Union Township is an inactive township in Marion County, in the U.S. state of Missouri.

Union Township was established in 1837.

References

Townships in Missouri
Townships in Marion County, Missouri